= 1968–69 Plunket Shield season =

Cricket tournament in New Zealand

1968–69 Plunket Shield
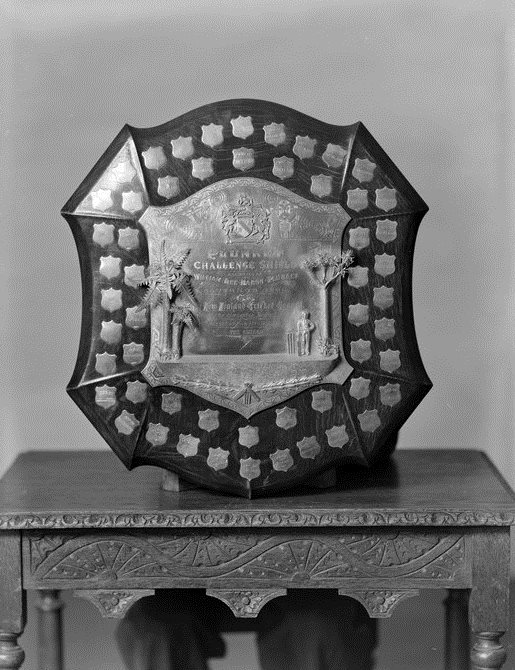
- The Plunket Shield trophy
- Cricket format: First-class
- Tournament format(s): Round-robin
- Champions: Auckland (12th title)
- Participants: 6
- Matches: 15

The 1968–69 Plunket Shield season was a tournament of the Plunket Shield, the domestic first-class cricket competition of New Zealand.

Auckland won the championship, finishing at the top of the points table at the end of the round-robin tournament between the six first-class sides, Auckland, Canterbury, Central Districts, Northern Districts, Otago and Wellington. Ten points were awarded for a win, five points for having a first innings lead in a draw and one point for a first innings deficit in a draw.

== Table ==
Below are the Plunket Shield standings for the season:

Team	Played	Won	Lost	Drawn	Points	Net RpW
Auckland	5	4	0	1	45	20.939
Canterbury	5	2	0	3	27	4.357
Central Districts	5	1	1	3	25	14.380
Wellington	5	1	3	1	11	−3.201
Northern Districts	5	0	2	3	7	−16.382
Otago	5	0	2	3	7	−27.878
